Grace Reformed Church, also known as Calvary Baptist Church (since 1959), is a historic church located at 201–211 S. Main Avenue in Newton, Catawba County, North Carolina, United States. It was built in 1887–1888, and is a Gothic Revival-style church building.  It has a cruciform plan, steeply pitched gable roof, corner towers of unequal height, and lancet arched doors and windows.   Attached to the church in 1927–1928, is a two-story Sunday School Building with a gable roof.

It was added to the National Register of Historic Places in 1990.

References

Baptist churches in North Carolina
Churches on the National Register of Historic Places in North Carolina
Gothic Revival church buildings in North Carolina
Churches completed in 1887
19th-century Baptist churches in the United States
Churches in Catawba County, North Carolina
National Register of Historic Places in Catawba County, North Carolina